Mario Gonsierowski (born 6 July 1956) is a German sports shooter. He competed in the mixed 50 metre rifle prone event at the 1980 Summer Olympics.

References

External links
 

1956 births
Living people
German male sport shooters
Olympic shooters of East Germany
Shooters at the 1980 Summer Olympics
People from Zwickau (district)
Sportspeople from Saxony